This is a list of the 15 members of the European Parliament for Ireland elected at the 1994 European Parliament election. They served in the 1994 to 1999 session.

List

Footnotes

See also
Members of the European Parliament 1994–1999 – List by country
List of members of the European Parliament, 1994–1999 – Full alphabetical list

External links
ElectionsIreland.org – 1994 European Parliament (Ireland) election results
European Parliament office in Ireland – Irish MEPs: 1994–99

1994-99
 List
Ireland